The 1887 Rutgers Queensmen football team represented Rutgers University as an independent during the 1887 college football season. The Queensmen compiled a 2–6 record and were outscored their opponents, 187 to 81. The team had no coach, and its captain was Clarence G. Scudder.

Schedule

References

Rutgers
Rutgers Scarlet Knights football seasons
Rutgers Queensmen football